Sajida Khairallah Talfah (born c. 1935) is the widow and cousin of former Iraqi President Saddam Hussein, and mother of two sons (Uday and Qusay) and three daughters (Raghad, Rana, and Hala) with him. She is the oldest daughter of Khairallah Talfah, her husband's maternal uncle.

Wife of Saddam Hussein
Sajida and her cousin Saddam had five children together. Their marriage was arranged when they were children. She was said to have been 2 years older than him. They met when Saddam was about 21 years old.

In 1964, their first son Uday was born followed by Qusay in 1966. In 1968 their first daughter Raghad was born, followed by Rana in 1969, and finally their youngest daughter Hala in 1972.

In 1986, Saddam married another woman, Samira Shahbandar, while still married to Sajida. Sajida was enraged, and Uday Hussein, son of Saddam and Sajida, was also angry over his father's new wife. Uday believed that his inheritance was endangered by the new wife. He also took it as an insult to his mother. In October 1988, at a party thrown in the honor of Suzanne Mubarak, the wife of Egyptian President Hosni Mubarak, Uday beat and stabbed Kamel Hana Gegeo to death. Uday believed that it was Kamel who had introduced Saddam and Samira, and that he had arranged their meetings. Although her husband married another woman, Sajida and Saddam never divorced.

Sajida hardly ever appeared in public with her husband, so for many years her existence was little known to the Iraqi people. However, when rumors surfaced that Saddam had married another woman, and that his family life was now strained, more pictures and videos appeared in the Iraqi media of Saddam and Sajida, as well as them with their children. These pictures and videos were intended to make it seem as if Saddam's family life was not strained

Sajida, along with many members of her family, fled Iraq in 1990 because of the Persian Gulf War, leaving Iraq before the bombings began. There are many different reports on where the Hussein family settled, but a possible location is Switzerland. The Hussein family returned to Iraq after the war was over.

Post-invasion and disappearance
Sajida is believed to have fled to Qatar hours before the bombing of Baghdad began on 20 March 2003. Her youngest daughter Hala is believed to have gone with her, while Raghad and Rana Hussein fled to neighbouring Jordan.

In July 2004, she hired a multilingual and multi-national defence team of some 20 lawyers to defend her husband during his trial for war crimes, crimes against humanity, and other offences. However, on August 8, 2005, Saddam's family announced that they had dissolved the Jordan-based legal team and that they had appointed Khalil al-Duleimi, the only Iraq-based member, as sole legal counsel.

On July 2, 2006, Iraq national security advisor Muwaffaq al-Rubaie announced that Sajida and her daughter Raghad are placed 16th and 17th on the Iraqi government's most wanted list for financing Sunni Muslim insurgents under Saddam's reign.

It is also believed that Sajida and her daughter Raghad have been funding the insurgency in Iraq with money they took with them as they fled the country. The lawyer leading Saddam's defence team stated that "the charges against Raghad and Sajida are baseless" and that Sajida "lives in her house in Qatar alone and has no contact with anyone, not even the lawyers". He also stated that Sajida "is undergoing medical treatment". 

In 2015, Sajida's family denied rumors that she had died.

In popular culture
She was played by Shohreh Aghdashloo in the BBC adaptation House of Saddam in 2008, in which her character played a major role.

See also
List of fugitives from justice who disappeared
Samira Shahbandar, Saddam's second wife

References

Further reading

 Mayada: Daughter of Iraq, a non-fiction book by Jean Sasson in which Sajida features as the accuser and torturer of one of the seventeen fellow prisoners of Mayada Al-Askari, whose stories the book tells.

External links

 
 Sajida Talfah's wife fled Iraq

1937 births
Fugitives
Fugitives wanted by Iraq
Living people
Place of birth missing (living people)
Talfah, Sajida Khairallah
Tulfah family